The Heinkel He 49 was a German single-bay, single-seat biplane of mixed construction armed with two machine guns. Four variants were made, the He 49a, He 49b, He 49c and He 49d.

Variants
Data from:
HD 49 original Heinkel designation for the He 49, before allocation of the Reichsluftfahrtministerium'' (RLM) designations.
He 49Lgeneric designation for any of the He 49 landplane variants.
He 49Wgeneric designation for the He 49 floatplane variant.
He 49aThe first prototype, (originally HD 49), was flown in November 1932
He 49bthe second prototype followed in February 1933, with a modified fuselage to make it  longer, powered by a BMW VI 6.0 V-12 engine.
He 49bWThe He 49b turned into a floatplane
He 49cThe third prototype
He 49dlater prototype Heinkel He 51

Specifications (Heinkel He 49b)

References

Heinkel He 049
He 049